1809 in philosophy

Events

Publications 
 Jean-Baptiste Lamarck's Philosophie Zoologique
 Friedrich Wilhelm Joseph Schelling's Philosophical Inquiries into the Essence of Human Freedom

Births 
 January 4 - Louis Braille (died 1852)
 February 12 - Charles Darwin (died 1882)
 August 29 - Oliver Wendell Holmes, Sr. (died 1894)
 September 6 - Bruno Bauer (died 1882)

Deaths 
 June 8 - Thomas Paine (born 1737)

References 

Philosophy
19th-century philosophy
Philosophy by year